Steve Churchyard is an English record producer, recording engineer and mixer who began his career at Sir George Martin’s AIR Studios in London. He currently resides in the United States. He has been nominated for 15 Grammy awards. In 2008 he won a Latin Grammy for Juanes' album La Vida... Es Un Ratico. In 2010, he won a Latin Grammy for the album Paraíso Express by Alejandro Sanz.

In 2011, Steve Churchyard received a Grammy nomination for Katy Perry's album Teenage Dream and again in 2012 for Jason Mraz's album Love Is a Four Letter Word. He has multiple previous nominations.

He has worked on recordings by INXS, Eagles, Billy Joel, Sex Pistols, Meat Loaf, Keith Urban, Shakira, George Michael, Hanson, Faith Hill, The Darkness, Scorpions, Avril Lavigne, Kelly Clarkson, Joni Mitchell, Blinker the Star, Siouxsie and the Banshees, Dalis Car, The Pretenders, Warren Zevon, The Stranglers, and Adele.

Steve Churchyard was featured in the book Behind the Glass by Howard Massey.

References

External links
Steve Churchyard official website
Steve Churchyard on Discogs.com
[ Steve Churchyard on AllMusic.com]
Grammys - Past Winners Search
Steve Churchyard Interview NAMM Oral History Library (2016)

English record producers
Year of birth missing (living people)
Living people
English audio engineers
Latin Grammy Award winners